Wiesent may refer to:

 Wiesent, Bavaria, a municipality in Regensburg District, Bavaria, Germany
 Wiesent (Danube), a river in Bavaria that flows into the Danube
 Wiesent (Regnitz), a river in  Franconian Switzerland, Bavaria, that flows into the Regnitz

See also
 Wisent, the European bison